Geshe Sonam Thargye is Spiritual Director of the Drol Kar Buddhist Centre in Anglesea, Victoria, Australia. He was born in the province of Kham, in eastern Tibet in 1962. After many years of studying Buddhist philosophy and practicing at Sera Je Monastic University in South India, he graduated in 1994 with the degree of Geshe Lharumpa. He established residence in Australia in 1998.

Geshe Sonam initiated an Australian tour by the Dalai Lama which took place in May 2002. In 2003, he created, with Australian artist Sue Ford, a multimedia artwork called Mind of Tibet.

See also
Gelug
Lam Rim

References

External links
Drol Kar Buddhist Centre

Lamas from Tibet
Chinese emigrants to Australia
Living people
Geshes
20th-century lamas
21st-century lamas
Year of birth missing (living people)